Between Birth and Death is the second and final studio album by Australian nu metal band Sunk Loto. Released in November 2003, it peaked at No. 48 on the ARIA Albums Chart.

At the ARIA Music Awards of 2004 it was nominated for Engineer of the Year for Paul McKercher's work. McKellar was also its producer.

Track listing
 "5 Years of Silence" – 3:46
 "Fall Apart" – 3:29
 "Empty and Alone" – 3:03
 "Help" – 4:01
 "Starved" – 4:13
 "Everything Everyway" – 3:35
 "Burning Bridges" – 2:51
 "INSIDE" – 2:40
 "Past Tense Existence" – 2:40
 "Public Imagery" – 2:28
 "Erased" – 3:30
 "Soul Worn Thin" – 5:25

Charts

References 

2003 albums
Sunk Loto albums